Aseer Zadi is a Pakistani drama television series written by Mustafa Afridi, directed by Mohammed Ehteshamuddin, produced by Momina Duraid and broadcast on Hum TV. The series started on 17 August 2013 and went off-air on 25 January 2014. It featured an ensemble star cast consisting of Sania Saeed, Ainy Jaffri, Sakina Samo, Salman Shahid, Farah Shah, Noor Hassan Rizvi, Eshita Mehboob, Yasir Shoro, Saniya Shamshad, Saife Hassan and Farooq Zameer in prominent roles.

The show was selected to run on Indian Channel Zindagi under the name Pyar Ka Haq, before it was renamed as Bandini but this decision was later changed.

Synopsis
"Aseer Zadi" is a story about a family that prides itself in its traditions and all the men of the family have married thrice since their first and second wives were not capable of bearing them children. The family only thinks that the third wife can give birth to a child and even if first or second wife gives birth to a child, the child is killed. The head of the family Great Peer marries Amna who becomes pregnant but her child is killed. He marries Naseem who is incapable and finally he marries Bari Sarkar who gives birth to a boy Shahaab while Amna and Naseem are treated as Living Deadbodies wearing only a white suit. Many years pass and Shahaab has grown up.

The same is going to happen with him but he hates this principle. His third wife will be Fatima, daughter of Bari Sarkar's brother. Bari Sarkar loves her more than Shahaab but Shahaab hates her. Fatima always teases Amna and Naseem. Shahaab is married to Yasmeen but as she could not bear a child, he is being married to Maira. Maira at first rejects because of the family principle which makes Amna and Naseem happy. Although Maira and Yasmeen are wives of the same man, they are good friends. Shahaab starts liking Maira whereas Maira's cousin Bilal calls her at her in-laws house. Fatima manipulates the situation in such a way that Shahaab starts doubting Maira. Bari Sarkar abuses Maira but Peer Jalal  supports Maira. Seeing both of them alone, Amna suspects an affair between them which creates misunderstanding between Peer Jalal and Bari Sarkar but all that is resolved as Amna was thinking wrong. Maira and Shahaab have a nice relationship. They both go for a honeymoon.

Now Shahaab has to marry Fatima. He returns but Maira faints so he goes back and doesn't come till 1 am. On the other hand, the doctor says to Shahaab that Maira is pregnant. When he tells the truth to Bari Sarkar, she throws Maira in a room. Bari Sarkar says that she will take her to a doctor. But Amna warns Maira by saying what had happened with her. Amna  starts blackmailing Peer Jalal while Naseem abuses Peer Jalal and Bari Sarkar by saying the incident which happened with Amna. She says what happened with me should not happen to Maira. He agrees. On the other hand, Shahaab calls Dr. Mehrunnisa in their home. While Naseem says to Amna that she has taken advantage of this situation but Amna says that she has done right. Bari Sarkar goes to her brother's house for forgiveness but to no avail while Fatima supports Bari Sarkar. Upon hearing the truth, Bari Sarkar is shocked. Fatima starts crying while Maira ridicules Fatima. Yasmeen comes and threatens Maira by saying that she is just pregnant there is no full guarantee that she will give birth to this child. Maira is shocked by Yasmeen's behaviour Now Amna, Naseem and Yasmeen are no more living dead bodies who wear white suits as widow but wearing expensive colourful suits. Yasmeen lures towards Shahaab which makes Maira suspicious. Her mother tells her to keep some distance from Yasmeen. At first she ignores, but later believes. While coming from her mother's home to her in-laws house, she forgets the cloth which is compulsory for all the girls of the house and so Bari Sarkar is furious at her. Maira taunts her by saying that her husband has no problem so whats her problem. Shahaab is angry with Maira. 
Bari Sarkar, in anger, leaves the house and goes to her brother Sikandar's house. Fatima supports Bari Sarkar which makes Sikandar angry. Shahaab comes to take Bari Sarkar but Fatima refuses by saying that if anyone from the mansion comes to pick Bari Sarkar, he/she should be  thrown out of the house. Peer Jalal creates problems between Maira and Shahaab by saying that the child in Maira's womb does not belong to Shahaab. Maira goes to her house where Bilal tells Maira to go in her in-laws house which makes Maira angry. He calls her twice and then again her phone rings she thinks its Bilal and she abuses Bilal but it is of Shahaab. Maira becomes tensed.

Now Naseem starts behaving as the Bari Sarkar of the house. Fatima takes care of Bari Sarkar and goes to bring breakfast. Bari Sarkar sees her laptop as an audio clip is opened and she presses the Play Button. She hears that Fatima has insulted Shahaab and is happy. She feels dejected as she had loved her more than anyone and she betrayed her by saying that no one has arrived to pick her up. She goes to her house but now she is no more arrogant and a vamp but a good woman. She learns of Peer Jalal's lies and tells Shahaab to pick Maira. While Yasmeen wants a child from Shahaab, Amna requests Naseem to forgive Peer Jalal and finally she forgives him. Maira meanwhile is angry with Shahaab so Bari Sarkar consoles her.

On the other hand, Fatima goes mentally ill. So Sikandar vows to take revenge from Maira. Yasmeen's jealousy is increased so much that she asks divorce from Shahaab but he doesn't give her. Maira tells Shahaab to spend some time with Yasmeen as she is also his wife. Maira is going to the doctor so Bari Sarkar also joins her. Peer Jalal calls Sikander that this is the right time as Maira is going out. Bari Sarkar says to Maira that both boy and girl are same Meanwhile, Sikandar shoots the car in which Maira is going and sees a blooded hand. He is very happy. Shahaab gets a call and he and Yasmeen go to hospital where it is revealed that Bari Sarkar, not Maira, was fatally struck by the bullet. Peer Jalal commits suicide.

Many years have passed and Maira has three kids-two sons and one daughter. Yasmeen on the other hand is unhappy so Maira gives her son to Yasmeen forever. Yasmeen is happy. When Shahaab asks Maira that what should be our daughter's name, she replies that it will be Zeenat Shahabuddin as this was Bari Sarkar's original name. Maira and Shahaab live happily forever.

Cast
 Sania Saeed as Bari Sarkar/Zeenat Begum, Peer's third wife, Shahaab's mother and Fatima's paternal aunt
 Ainy Jaffri as Maira, Shahaab's second wife
 Farooq Zameer as Maira's father
 Noor Hassan Rizvi as Shahaab, Maira's husband and Bari Sarkar's son
 Salman Shahid as Peer Jalal 
 Sakina Samo as Amna, Peer's first wife
 Farah Shah as Naseem, Peer's second wife
 Eshita Mehboob as Yasmeen, Shahaab's first wife
 Saniya Shamshad as Fatima, Bari Sarkar's niece. Likes Shahaab and ridicules Amna and Naseem
 Yasir Shoro as Bilal, Maira's paternal cousin and love interest
 Saife Hassan as Bari Sarkar's brother and Fatima's father
 Mehak Ali as Fatima's mother
 Humaira Zaheer as Firdous, Blial's mother and Maira's paternal aunt
 Ghazala Javaid as Maira's mother

Awards 
Being a popular serial, Aseerzadi was nominated for 8 categories at the 2nd Hum Awards but had 13 nominations. The role of Sania Saeed was appreciated and was nominated thrice while Sakina Samo left an everlasting impact on the minds of the people. Although it had 13 nominations, it could only win three awards due to Zindagi Gulzar Hai.

References

External links 
Official website
Asserzadi at IMDb

Hum TV original programming
2013 Pakistani television series debuts
Pakistani drama television series
Urdu-language television shows